Picking Up the Pieces or Pickin' Up the Pieces may refer to:

Film and television 
 Picking Up the Pieces (film), a 2000 film directed by Alfonso Arau and starring Woody Allen
 Picking Up the Pieces, a 1985 television movie starring Margot Kidder
 Picking Up the Pieces, a 1998 UK TV drama serial starring Amanda Abbington

Music 
 Picking Up the Pieces (Jewel album), 2015
 Picking Up the Pieces (Seventh Day Slumber album), 2003
 Pickin' Up the Pieces (Fitz and the Tantrums album), 2010
 Pickin' Up the Pieces (Poco album), 1969
 "Pickin' Up the Pieces" (song), the title song
 "Picking Up the Pieces" (Difford & Tilbrook song), 1984
 "Picking Up the Pieces" (Paloma Faith song), 2012

See also 
 Pick Up the Pieces (disambiguation)